Tilly Armstrong (8 April 1927 – 6 July 2010) was a British writer of romance novels from 1978 to 1998. She also wrote as Tania Langley and Kate Alexander.

Armstrong was born in Sutton, Surrey.  Before she began her writing career, she worked for the World Health Organization in Geneva, then in Canada for 18 months, and then became the personal secretary to the Chairman of British Steel, Lord Melchett.

She was the fourteenth elected Chairman (1987–1989) of the Romantic Novelists' Association, and was one of its vice-presidents, until her death at 83, on 6 July 2010, at Carshalton, England, UK.

Bibliography
Armstrong wrote under her own name and under two pseudonyms.

As Tilly Armstrong

Lightly Like a Flower (1978)
Come Live With Me (1979)
Joy Runs High (1979)
Limited Engagement (1980)
Summer Tangle (1983)
Small Town Girl (1984)
Pretty Penny (1985)

As Tania Langley

Dawn (1980)
Mademoiselle Madeleine (1981)
The London Linnet (1985)
Genevra (1987)

As Kate Alexander

Fields of Battle (1981)
Friends and Enemies (1982)
Paths of Peace (1984)
Bright Tomorrows (1985)
Songs of War (1987)
Great Possessions (1989)
The Shining Country (1991)
The House of Hope (1992)
Voices of Song (1994)
The Anthology of Love and Romance (edited, 1994) (including stories by Rosamunde Pilcher, Georgette Heyer, Edith Wharton et al)
Family Trees (1995)
''Love and Duty' (1998)

References

1927 births
2010 deaths
British romantic fiction writers
People from Sutton, London
20th-century British novelists
Pseudonymous women writers
20th-century British women writers
20th-century pseudonymous writers